Belcher Family Homestead and Farm is a historic home and farm complex located at Berkshire in Tioga County, New York. The farmhouse is a two-story, five-bay frame house built about 1850 in a vernacular Gothic Revival style with a porch with Carpenter Gothic details.  A second house, a -story, five-bay frame structure, was built about 1815 in a vernacular Federal style.  Also on the property is a mid-19th-century barn, a late 19th-century dairy barn with silo, and a small shed.

It was listed on the National Register of Historic Places in 1984.

References

Houses on the National Register of Historic Places in New York (state)
Federal architecture in New York (state)
Gothic Revival architecture in New York (state)
Houses completed in 1850
Houses in Tioga County, New York
National Register of Historic Places in Tioga County, New York